Shaun Jamel Smith (born August 19, 1981) is a former American football defensive end in the National Football League for the Dallas Cowboys, Cincinnati Bengals, New Orleans Saints, Cleveland Browns, Kansas City Chiefs, and Tennessee Titans. He also was a member of the Las Vegas Locomotives in the United Football League. He was signed by the Dallas Cowboys as an undrafted free agent in 2003. He played college football at the University of South Carolina.

Early years
Smith attended Midwood High School in Brooklyn, New York. He transferred after his sophomore season to Wichita Heights High School in Wichita, Kansas. He played as a defensive end.

He enrolled at Butler Community College in El Dorado, Kansas. As a freshman in 1999, Smith along with teammate Rudi Johnson, contributed to the school winning the national championship by defeating Dixie College. As a sophomore in 2000, he registered 128 tackles and a school single-season record 20 sacks.

As a junior in 2001, he transferred to the University of South Carolina, where he was a backup defensive end, making 11 tackles. As a senior in 2002, he started 2 games and posted 38 tackles, one sack and one fumble recovery in 12 games.

Professional career

Dallas Cowboys
Smith was signed as an undrafted free agent by the Dallas Cowboys after the 2003 NFL Draft on May 1. He was signed to the practice squad on September 1 after being waived on August 31. He was released on August 31, 2004.

Arizona Cardinals
Smith was claimed off waivers by the Arizona Cardinals on September 1, 2004. He was waived five days later on September 5.

New Orleans Saints
On September 7, 2004, he was signed to the New Orleans Saints' practice squad. He was promoted to the active roster on September 18 and made his debut versus the San Francisco 49ers on September 19. He finished with 16 tackles and one start. He was released on November 30, after getting food from the Georgia Dome press box, while being deactivated for a game.

Cincinnati Bengals (first stint)
Smith was claimed off waivers by the Cincinnati Bengals on December 2, 2004. He played defensive tackle, while recording six tackles and one start. In 2005, he recorded 38 tackles in 13 games with five starts. In 2006, he registered 14 tackles. In 2007, the Bengals opted not to match the restricted free-agent offer sheet that Smith received from the Cleveland Browns.

Cleveland Browns
Smith signed a four-year deal with the Cleveland Browns as a restricted free agent on March 16, 2007. He played mostly as a defensive end in a 3-4 defense, started 11 games and made 62 tackles.

In 2008, he was tried at nose tackle during training camp, but was moved back to defensive end. He started 9 out of 11 games, while making 47 tackles and being limited with a calf injury. On December 23, various media outlets reported that Brady Quinn had a physical altercation with Smith in the Browns' weight training room, and that Smith punched Quinn in the face. Quinn denied the reports, and coach Romeo Crennel refused to comment; Browns tight end Darnell Dinkins confirmed the fight during a radio interview on WQAL. Smith did not play in the following game because of a coaches' decision. He was released on August 8, 2009.

Detroit Lions
Smith was signed by the Detroit Lions on August 10, 2009. Smith was released during the final roster cuts on September 5.  He also was suspended for the first 4 games of the season for violating the league's anabolic steroid policy.

Las Vegas Locomotives (UFL)
On November 19, 2009, he signed with the Las Vegas Locomotives of the United Football League, to replace an injured Wendell Bryant. He contributed to the team winning the UFL Champsionship game against the Florida Tuskers on November 27.

Cincinnati Bengals (second stint)
Smith was re-signed by the Bengals on December 9, 2009. He was waived on December 12 and re-signed on December 16. He was not re-signed after the season.

Kansas City Chiefs (first stint)
Smith signed with the Kansas City Chiefs on March 10, 2010.  In consecutive weeks, he was accused by players from the opposing team of grabbing them in their private parts during play. Alex Mack of the Cleveland Browns made the first claim after the two teams' Week 2 matchup, followed by Anthony Davis of the San Francisco 49ers, who drew a penalty for retaliating against Smith in Week 3. Although Smith denied both allegations, he was fined by the league.

Tennessee Titans
On July 29 of 2011, he signed with the Tennessee Titans a three-year, $7.25 million contract, to play as a defensive tackle. He scored his first career rushing touchdown on Week 12 against the Seattle Seahawks. He finished with 6 starts, 25 tackles and one sack.

In 2012, he showed up in training camp out of shape and underperformed. He was released on August 22.

Kansas City Chiefs (second stint)
On November 5, 2012, he re-signed with the Kansas City Chiefs, to serve as insurance in case Glenn Dorsey missed multiple games with a calf injury. He was not re-signed for the 2013 season.

References

1981 births
Living people
Sportspeople from Brooklyn
Players of American football from New York City
American football defensive tackles
American football defensive ends
Butler Grizzlies football players
South Carolina Gamecocks football players
Dallas Cowboys players
Arizona Cardinals players
New Orleans Saints players
Cincinnati Bengals players
Cleveland Browns players
Detroit Lions players
Las Vegas Locomotives players
Kansas City Chiefs players
Tennessee Titans players
Midwood High School alumni